Peter Attrill (born 28 November 1929) is an Australian former sailor who competed in the 1952 Summer Olympics.

References

External links
 
 
 

1929 births
Living people
Australian male sailors (sport)
Olympic sailors of Australia
Sailors at the 1952 Summer Olympics – Finn